Aspidistra campanulata is a species of flowering plant. A. campanulata grows in evergreen forests on very steep slopes of eroded limestone mountains in Vietnam. Its name is due to the bell shape of its perigone.

Description
This species is a perennial herb.

Flowers are found solitary, with an upright, thin and stiff peduncle,  in size, showing two bracts basally and one next to the flower. Flowers are positioned slantedly upright or horizontally, and are pleasantly fragranced. These lobes don't possess keels, however they do show 3 nerves running down to the tube base, as well as a side vein fusing with that of the adjacent lobe. It counts with 6 stamens at the base of the tube, surrounding the style, the filaments of which measure .

Distribution
Aspidistra campanulata is known only from its type locality, in Na Hang District, Tuyên Quang Province, Vietnam.

References

Further reading
Lin, Chun‐Rui, Wei‐Bin Xu, and Yan Liu. "Aspidistra albiflora sp. nov.(Asparagaceae) from southwestern Guangxi, China." Nordic Journal of Botany29.4 (2011): 443–446.
Tillich, H‐J. "An updated and improved determination key for Aspidistra Ker‐Gawl.(Ruscaceae, Monocotyledons)." Feddes Repertorium 119.5‐6 (2008): 449–462.
Tillich, Hans-Juergen. "The genus Aspidistra Ker-Gawl.(Asparagaceae) in Vietnam." Taiwania 59.1 (2014): 1–8.

External links

campanulata
Flora of Vietnam
Plants described in 2007